James Charles Murray Balfour,  (30 September 1914 – 19 May 1990) was a long-serving Member of Legislative Assembly (MLA) and Cabinet Minister in the Legislative Assembly, in the State Parliament of Victoria, Australia. 

Born in the Melbourne suburb of Windsor to James Miller Balfour and his wife Katrine Elizabeth Alice (née Murray), Balfour was educated at Geelong College. He went on to become a dairy farmer, settling at Willow Grove near Trafalgar in the Latrobe Valley of Gippsland, Victoria. On 6 February 1937 he married Mary Emma Savige, with whom he had five sons.

From 1946 to 1967, Balfour served on Narracan Shire Council, and served as President from 1946-1947, 1950-1951, and 1960-1961.

In 1955, he was elected to the Victorian Legislative Assembly for Morwell, representing the Liberal Party.

From 1958 to 1961 he was Government Whip, and from 1961 to 1964 Cabinet Secretary. In 1964, he entered Cabinet as Minister of Water Supply and Mines, a portfolio that was reorganised to become Lands, Soldier Settlement and Conservation a few months later. In 1967, he moved to the new seat of Narracan and became Minister of Fuel and Power and of Mines. In 1977 he became Minister for Minerals and Energy, a position from which he resigned in 1981, in readiness for his retirement at the 1982 election.

In 1981, his service was honoured as a CBE.

Following Balfour's retirement from politics in 1982, he was involved in the regional TAFE program and other community activities, particularly in the Latrobe Valley. He died in 1990.

References

1914 births
1990 deaths
Liberal Party of Australia members of the Parliament of Victoria
Members of the Victorian Legislative Assembly
Australian Commanders of the Order of the British Empire
20th-century Australian politicians
People from Windsor, Victoria
Politicians from Melbourne